Bevern is the name of the following places in Germany:

 Bevern, Schleswig-Holstein, a municipality in the district of Pinneberg, Schleswig-Holstein
 Bevern, Lower Saxony, a municipality in the district of Holzminden, Lower Saxony
 Bevern (Samtgemeinde), in Lower Saxony
 A place near Essen (Oldenburg)